Toni Liias (born 16 October 1986) is a Finnish racing cyclist. He won the Finnish national road race title in 2009.

References

External links

1986 births
Living people
Finnish male cyclists
Place of birth missing (living people)